The 2007 Basildon District Council election took place on 3 May 2007 to elect members of Basildon District Council in Essex, England. One third of the council was up for election and the Conservative party stayed in overall control of the council.

After the election, the composition of the council was
Conservative 28
Labour 11
Liberal Democrats 3

Campaign
The election saw the British National Party stand in 11 of the 14 wards being contested, an increase from 6 in 2006 and more than the Liberal Democrats who only stood in 9 seats.

There was controversy during the election over comments by the Conservative candidate in Vange, Luke Mackenzie, in an election leaflet where he called for voters who did not want asylum seekers to get council houses to vote Conservative. Other parties called on the Conservatives to disown Mackenzie, who was standing against the only ethnic minority councillor in Basildon, saying he was "peddling scare stories" and that the comments were "inflammatory". However Mackenzie denied increasing racial tension, saying voters felt immigration was "entirely out of control" and that a shortage of housing was caused by people from outside of Basildon, and was defended by the leaders of the Conservative group in Basildon.

Election result
The results saw the Conservative hold control of the council after gaining one seat from Labour. The Conservatives took Laindon Park, but narrowly failed to take the targeted wards of Pitsea North West and Vange from Labour, by 19 and 68 votes respectively. The Conservative share of the vote was down on the 2006 election at 43%, while Labour won 22%. Overall turnout in the election was 30%, a decline from the 33.5% recorded in 2006.

All comparisons in vote share are to the corresponding 2003 election.

Ward results

Billericay East

Billericay West

Burstead

Fryerns

Laindon Park

Lee Chapel North

Nethermayne

Pitsea North West

Pitsea South East

St Martin's

Vange

Wickford Castledon

Wickford North

Wickford Park

References

2007
2007 English local elections
2000s in Essex